Nothing to Wear is a 1928 American comedy film directed by Erle C. Kenton and starring Jacqueline Logan, Theodore von Eltz and Bryant Washburn.

Cast
 Jacqueline Logan as Jackie Standish 
 Theodore von Eltz as Phil Stanndish 
 Bryant Washburn as Tommy Butler 
 Jane Winton as Irene Hawley 
 William Irving as Detective 
 Edythe Flynn as Maid

References

Bibliography
 James Monaco. The Encyclopedia of Film. Perigee Books, 1991.

External links

1928 films
1928 comedy films
Silent American comedy films
Films directed by Erle C. Kenton
American silent feature films
1920s English-language films
Columbia Pictures films
American black-and-white films
1920s American films